Lucas Li Jing-feng (26 February 1922 – 17 November 2017) was a Chinese Roman Catholic bishop.

Li was born in Gaoling County in 1922. He was ordained a priest in 1947, and detained in 1959. Shortly after his release in 1980, Li was consecrated as coadjutor bishop of Fengxiang.  Three years later, he was named bishop of Fengxiang and served until his death in 2017. The Chinese government formally recognized Li's leadership of Fengxiang in 2004, although he never joined the Chinese Patriotic Catholic Association.

References

1922 births
2017 deaths
21st-century Roman Catholic bishops in China
People from Xi'an
Chinese prisoners and detainees
Prisoners and detainees of the People's Republic of China
20th-century Roman Catholic bishops in China